Uwini was Makalaka leader from Zimbabwe. He was considered a divinity. He was in the resistance against the British colonialism and was accused of participating in the murder of white settlers by the British South Africa Company. He was tried by court-martial and executed on the edge of the Somaboola (Somabhula) Forest about 80 miles from Bulawayo in 1896.

Sources 
Robert Baden-Powell: The Matabele-Campaign 1896. - Online-Ausgabe in Englisch

1896 deaths
Rhodesian people
Year of birth missing
People of the First Matabele War

References